"Somewhere Out There" is a song by Canadian alternative rock group Our Lady Peace. It was released on April 1, 2002, as the lead single from their fifth studio album, Gravity. It was the most successful single from the album, reaching number 44 on the US Billboard Hot 100 and peaking inside the top 40 on five other Billboard charts. "Somewhere Out There" was the ninth-most played song on radio in Canada in 2002.

Song information
The correct title of the song is indeed "Somewhere Out There", however the specific chorus lyrics "defying gravity" and the fact that the album is titled Gravity, led some to believe that the title of the song was "Gravity". The song is mislabeled as such in some search engines, lyric websites, and P2P file-sharing programs.

The song is one of Our Lady Peace's most successful singles to date, having been very popular both in Canada and the United States. Many critics praised the single, but some also criticized it for being "too mainstream", saying that the artistic uniqueness that Our Lady Peace possessed in former albums was absent here.

In one of Our Lady Peace's most recent albums, A Decade, which includes many of Our Lady Peace's greatest hits, "Somewhere Out There" is featured. The song also plays during the end credits of White Noise and an episode of Smallville.

Background and writing
"Somewhere Out There" was culled from two sets of lyrics written by Raine Maida during Christmas 2001. "Bob called me in Toronto the night before Christmas and asked if I had any other song ideas that we should consider before we headed back to Hawaii to finish the album in January," he explained. "The phone call propelled me to write seven new songs during the ten days we had off at Christmas. When we got back to Maui, he combined a verse from one song and a chorus from another and 'Somewhere Out There" was born.

Singles
Four versions of the single were released. In the United States and Canada, a one-track promotional CD was sent to radio stations only. In Australia, where the single was commercially released on September 16, 2002, three live bonus tracks—"Starseed", "Whatever", and "4 AM"—were included. They were recorded in June 2001 in Syracuse, New York during the Spiritual Machines tour. "4 AM" is sung entirely by the audience. The single was released in Europe on September 16, 2002 with "Whatever" omitted. The fourth version, released in 2003 as part of the promotion for Live, contains the live version of "Bring Back the Sun" from that album.

Music video
The music video was directed by Eric Heimbold. It was filmed in Montreal around April. It shows the band performing for fans on a rounded stage lit up in a very dark studio. Most of the video focuses on a woman, played by actress Sarah Sanguin Carter, who climbs to the top of a speaker tower and then throws herself off, being caught by the crowd. The video was officially released on May 22, 2002. This is also Steve Mazur's first appearance in the band since former lead guitarist Mike Turner left to form Fair Ground.

Charts

Weekly charts

Year-end charts

Release history

References

External links
 

2002 songs
2002 singles
Our Lady Peace songs
Song recordings produced by Bob Rock
Songs written by Raine Maida